Bathylutichthys taranetzi is a fish in the genus Bathylutichthys.

References

taranetzi
Fish described in 1990